The 2023 Super Formula Lights Championship will be the fourth Super Formula Lights Championship season, after the Japanese Formula 3 Championship was rebranded following the end of the 2019 season.  It will feature drivers competing in Dallara 320 chassis and with engines made by three different manufacturers, a similar regulation format to the Euroformula Open Championship.

Teams and drivers

Driver changes 
2021 Formula 4 UAE champion Enzo Trulli moves over to Japan to replace the reigning champion Kazuto Kotaka who graduates to Super Formula with Kondō Racing.
Reigning Japanese F4 champion Syun Koide is promoted to replace Kakunoshin Ohta at Toda Racing, as Ohta is promoted to Dandelion Racing in Super Formula.

David Vidales moves over to Japan with B-Max Racing, after competing in Formula 3 in 2022. He will be joined by another Formula 3 graduate in Igor Fraga, who last competed in 2020 with Charouz Racing System.

Race calendar 
The calendar for the 2023 season was announced on 30 November 2022. With the first event being in late May, the season will start six weeks later than usual. Only three events will be held supporting the parent Super Formula Championship, a significant reduction from previous years.

Championship standings 
The points will be awarded as follows:

Every drivers' four worst results will be dropped.

References

External links 
 Super Formula Lights official website – Japanese / English

Japanese Formula 3 Championship
Super Formula Lights
Super Formula Lights
Super Formula Lights